Sègre  was a former department of the First French Empire in present-day Spain and Andorra, named after the river Segre. It incorporated Andorra. Val d'Aran, which is in the north side of the Pyrenees, was instead incorporated to the department of Haute-Garonne.

Sègre was created on 26 January 1812 when Catalonia was annexed by the French Empire. 
Its subprefectures were Talarn, and Solsona. Its prefecture was Puigcerdà; the only prefect was Jean Louis Rieul de Viefville des Essarts, from February 1812 to 1813.

In March 1813 it was merged with the department of Ter into the department of Ter-et-Sègre.    This merger was established by decree but never published in the Bulletin des lois, nor endorsed by any senatorial decree, leaving its legal status uncertain.

In 1814 the French left the Iberian Peninsula, having occupied it since 1808. The departments disappeared.

Sources

Former departments of France in Spain
1812 establishments in the First French Empire
19th century in Andorra